Joginder Singh Rana is an Indian politician. He is the member of the Aam Aadmi Party. He won the Municipal Corporation of Delhi election on 7 December 2022 by winning margin of 931 votes.

Controversy
Joginder Singh Rana booked under Arms Act for ‘brandishing’ pistol after winning MCD election of 2022.

References

Living people
Indian politicians
Year of birth missing (living people)